The Australian grapevine viroid (abbreviated AGV) is a type of grapevine viroid.

See also 
 List of viruses

References 

Viroids
Viral grape diseases